Ministeria vibrans is a bacterivorous amoeba with filopodia that was originally described to be suspended by a flagellum-like stalk attached to the substrate. Molecular and experimental work later on demonstrated the stalk is indeed a flagellar apparatus.

The amoeboid protist Ministeria vibrans occupies a key position to understand animal origins. It is a member of the Filasterea, that is the sister-group to Choanoflagellatea and Metazoa. Two Ministeria amoebae species have been reported so far, both of them from coastal marine water samples: M. vibrans and M. marisola. However, there is currently only one culture available, that of Ministeria vibrans.

The life cycle of Ministeria remains unknown.

Microvilli in Ministeria suggest their presence in the common ancestor of Filasterea and Choanoflagellata. The kinetid structure of Ministeria is similar to that of the choanocytes of the most deep-branching sponges, differing essentially from the kinetid of choanoflagellates. Thus, kinetid and microvilli of Ministeria illustrate features of the common ancestor of three holozoan groups: Filasterea, Metazoa and Choanoflagellata.

References

Filasterea
Filasterean species
Protists described in 1997